St. John's Preparatory School is a grade 6–12 private, Catholic, all-boys college-preparatory school located at 72 Spring Street, Danvers, Massachusetts, United States. It was established in 1907 by the Xaverian Brothers. 

St. John's was formerly a combination commuter-boarding school but ended its residential program in 1975.

Campus
The student population spends the majority of its time in the four main academic buildings:
 A.E. Studzinski Library (2003)
 Xavier Hall (built 1911; renovated 2004–05)
 Brother Benjamin Hall (1964; renovated in 2015 to house the middle school)
 Brother Keefe, CFX Academic Center (2015)
 
Other buildings of note include:
 The Administration Building (1880), which includes a chapel
 Ryken Center for the Arts (1916; renovated 1995), a former dormitory building that has been renovated into a fine arts facility
 Memorial Dining Hall (1925; renovated in 2007), the cafeteria
 Alumni Hall (1965; renovated in 1993), home to the 350-seat Kaneb Theatre
 Memorial Gymnasium (1955; renovated 1991)
 Leo and Joan Mahoney Wellness Center (2017)
 
Also on the property of St. John's are two homes for Xaverian Brothers:
 Xaverian House
 The Xavier Center

School life

Athletics
St. John's Prep is a member of the MIAA's Catholic Conference. The other members of the Catholic Conference include Malden Catholic High School, Boston College High School, and Catholic Memorial High School. St. John's is the sixth team in the conference in some sports.

Since 2001, the swim and dive team has won twelve Division-1 State Titles, including nine in a row between 2006 and 2014, with the most recent title in 2022. The fencing team won their 6th straight state championship and went undefeated in the 2009–2010 season.
 The golf team won the state championship in the fall of 2010 and 2015, and came in second place in 2011 following a league title.

In 2012, 2018, and 2019 the varsity football team won the state title in the MIAA Division 1 championship. The hockey team won the Super 8 state title in 2015 and the state championship in 2022 against their rivals Xaverian Brothers High School. The Cross Country team claimed the Division 1 state title in 2019.

Drama Guild
The St. John's Prep Drama Guild presents two major productions a year: a fall production, and in the spring, an entry into the Massachusetts State Drama Festival. Through the rigorous drama classes offered through the Fine Arts Department, students gain an understanding of the inner-workings of theater which is then applied in the productions. Recent fall productions include Peter and the Starcatchers, Beauty and the Beast, Anonymous, Young Frankenstein, One Man Two Guvnors, Spamalot, The Laramie Project, How to Succeed in Business Without Really Trying, The Last Days of Judas Iscariot, Animal Crackers, On the Razzle and Crazy for You.
 
The St. John's Prep Drama Guild is currently in first place for all time victories in the Massachusetts State Drama Festival (presented by the METG), with 19 wins. Their participation in the festival began in 1974 under the direction of Brother Ron Santoro, and is now currently under the direction of Alicia Greenwood. Their first winning production was Molière's The Doctor in Spite of Himself in 1974. Recent festival entries include Gross Indecency: The Three Trials of Oscar Wild, Borealis, Iphigenia 2.0, The Quest of Queen Thomas, And God Created Great Whales, Metamorphoses, bobrauschenbergamerica, Macbeth, The Manhattan Project's Alice in Wonderland, The Green Bird, Richard III and The Odyssey. The Drama Guild won the Massachusetts's Educational Theatre Guild's 2017 Drama Festival with their production of The Quest of Queen Thomas by Brit Christopher, directed by Alicia Greenwood. They have also represented the state at the New England Festival on numerous occasions.
 
The St. John's Prep Drama Guild has two to three summer productions a year. Recent summer shows include Much Ado About Nothing, The Sparrow, and Middletown. These shows are often directed by alumni who have graduated from the St. John's Prep Drama Guild.

Clubs and Extracurriculars
St. John's is the home of more than 60 clubs and extracurricular activities. While faculty moderators are present, many of these groups are run solely by the students. The clubs include academic organizations, such as The Spire yearbook staff, The Concordia newspaper, and the Cicero Society debating club. Recreational clubs include the Improv Club and the Aviation Club. St. John's also has many clubs that help further prepare students for life after college, such as the Young Democrats, Young Republicans, Model United Nations, Mock Trial (model court hearing), Animal Welfare Club, and Future Entrepreneurs. There is also an Aviation Club managed by former principal Br. Timothy Paul. Minority outreach clubs exist as well, such as L.U.N.A. (Latinos Unidos "N" Accion) and Always our Brothers and Sisters, St. John's Prep's Gay/Straight Alliance. Many fine arts activities are offered, including after-school music lessons and the award-winning Drama Guild, Swingtown!, the Prep's faculty-student a cappella group.

Notable alumni

 Bo Burnham, writer/director of Eighth Grade, comedian
 Sandro Corsaro, Emmy-nominated TV show creator/producer
 Peter R. Dolan, (2007 DAA) '74, retired chairman of the board and chief executive officer, Bristol-Myers Squibb
 Thomas Fulham, president of Suffolk University in Boston
 Andrew Haldane, World War II Marine officer
 Michael J. Harrington, former United States Congressman
 Troy Lavallee, member of The Glass Cannon (podcast)
 The Juan Maclean, electronic musician
 Michael McCann, attorney, professor, sports journalist
 Rob Kerkovich, actor, NCIS: New Orleans, Cloverfield
 Bishop Robert Reed, (2017 DAA) '77, Auxiliary Bishop of Boston and President/CEO of the CatholicTV Network
 David Self, screenwriter, The Road to Perdition, The Wolfman
John J. Studzinski, (1998 DAA) '74, Vice Chairman of Investor Relations and Business Development at The Blackstone Group; philanthropist
Peter G. Torkildsen, former United States Congressman, former Chairman of Massachusetts Republican Party

Sports

 Matt Antonelli, baseball player for Wake Forest; first-round draft pick, San Diego Padres
 Colin Blackwell, professional hockey player for the Toronto Maple Leafs
 Bob Carpenter, first American-born hockey player drafted by an NHL team while still in high school
 Pat Connaughton, professional baseball and basketball player, Milwaukee Bucks
Dick Farley, former Williams College football coach and College Football Hall of Fame inductee
 Peter Giunta, secondary coach, New York Giants
 Jonathan Goff, football player, Vanderbilt University, New York Giants
 Ken Hodge, Jr., former NHL player with Boston, Tampa Bay and Minnesota
 Brian Kelly, Louisiana State University head football coach
 Rob Konrad, professional football player
 Steven Langton, 2x Olympic bronze medalist, bobsled
 Stephen Lombardozzi, second baseman for 1987 World Series champion Minnesota Twins; leading hitter of series (.412) with home run in Game 2
 Wayne Lucier, former professional football player
 John McCarthy, professional hockey player, San Jose Sharks
 Joe Mulligan, former MLB player (Boston Red Sox)
 Danny Murphy, former MLB player (Chicago Cubs, Chicago White Sox)
 Tim Murray, professional soccer player
 Bill O'Brien, (2013 DAA) '88, former NCAA and NFL head coach
 James Pedro, Olympic bronze medalist, judo
  Brian Pinho, NHL player with the Washington Capitals
 Scott Shaunessy, former NHL player with Quebec Nordiques
 Glenn Sherlock, bullpen coach, Arizona Diamondbacks
 Paul Sorrento, professional baseball player
 Brian St. Pierre, professional football player
 Mike Yastrzemski, professional baseball player, San Francisco Giants

References

External links
 

Catholic secondary schools in Massachusetts
Schools sponsored by the Xaverian Brothers
Catholic Conference (MIAA)
Educational institutions established in 1907
1907 establishments in Massachusetts